The Municipality of Črna na Koroškem is a municipality in northern Slovenia. The seat of the municipality is the town of Črna na Koroškem. It lies in the traditional Slovenian province of Carinthia, close to the border with Austria. Since 2005 it has been part of the larger Carinthia Statistical Region.

Geography
The municipal area stretches along the upper Meža Valley at the confluence of the Meža River with its tributary Javorje Creek. Due to its picturesque setting, the municipality is a popular destination for mountain hikers.

Settlements
In addition to the municipal seat of Črna na Koroškem, the municipality also includes the following settlements:

 Bistra
 Javorje
 Jazbina
 Koprivna
 Ludranski Vrh
 Podpeca
 Topla
 Žerjav

References

External links

Municipality of Črna na Koroškem on Geopedia

Municipalities of Slovenia
Carinthia (Slovenia)